William Saunders was a footballer who played as a goalkeeper in one game for Burslem Port Vale in January 1900.

Career
Saunders joined Burslem Port Vale in November 1899. His only known Second Division appearance came in a 5–0 thumping at Bolton Wanderers on 2 January 1900. He was released from the Athletic Ground at the close of the 1900–01 season.

Career statistics
Source:

References

Year of birth missing
Year of death missing
English footballers
Association football goalkeepers
Port Vale F.C. players
English Football League players